Khorixas is a constituency in the Kunene Region of northwestern Namibia. Its district capital is the town of Khorixas, its population in 2004 was 10,906. , it has 8,788 registered voters.

The name of this constituency comes from a derivation of the Khoekhoegowab word "Gorigas", which is a water bush that grows in the area. This area is famous for the Ugab Terraces, a stone monolith that can be seen from afar. There is also a petrified forest, and rock engravings in Twyfelfontein.

Politics
In the 2004 regional election, Sebastian Ignatius ǃGobs of the United Democratic Front (UDF) beat out Theophelus ǁKhamuseb of SWAPO for the regional councillor position with a vote total of 2623 against 1643.

The 2015 regional election were won by Elias ǀAro Xoagub of SWAPO with 2,554 votes, closely followed by UDF's ǃGobs with 2,008 votes. In the 2020 regional election UDF's ǃGobs beat SWAPO's Xoagub with 1,677 votes to 1,112.

References

Constituencies of Kunene Region
States and territories established in 1992
1992 establishments in Namibia